The Atlantic Coast Football League (ACFL) was a professional american football minor league that operated from 1962 to 1973.  Until 1969, many of its franchises had working agreements with NFL and AFL teams to serve as farm clubs. The league paid a base salary of $100 per game and had 36 players on each active roster.

For the first few years, Joe Rosentover served as league president. He had served in the same capacity for the American Football League (formerly the American Association) from 1947 to 1950; a relative, John Rosentover, had run the league from 1936 to 1947. In fact, several of the teams from the AA were revived in the ACFL, including the Providence Steam Roller, Newark Bears and a team in Paterson, New Jersey. By 1968, Rosentover had left the organization and been superseded by commissioner Cosmo Iacavazzi.

In 1965, three of the franchises (the Hartford Charter Oaks, Newark Bears and Springfield Acorns) joined with five teams from the United Football League to create the Continental Football League. The league picked up four franchises from that league when it folded in 1969 (Norfolk Neptunes, Orlando Panthers, Jersey Jays and Indianapolis Capitols); the Neptunes and Panthers were exactly the same teams as the Acorns and Bears respectively, having relocated during their time in the CoFL.

In 1970, the Orlando Panthers signed a husband and wife duo, Steven and Patricia Palinkas, as a kicker and holder respectively. Steven did not make the team, but Patricia did, making her the first female professional football player. Other notable ACFL players included Pro Bowl fullback Marvin Hubbard, league leading running back Mel Meeks, kicker Booth Lusteg, three-time championship winning quarterback Jim "The King" Corcoran, eventual 11-year NFL veteran Bob Tucker, and offensive lineman Paul "Dr. Z" Zimmermann, who shortly after his retirement began an over 40-year career as a sportswriter, much of that time with Sports Illustrated. Hall of Fame running back Steve Van Buren coached in the league from its launch through 1966. One of the most unusual players in league history was DB Kiyo "Doc" Tashiro, a practicing doctor and Harvard alum, who was the oldest player to play in a pro football league when he retired after 1964 season at the age of 47 (his record was later broke by George Blanda in 1975). He played for Newark Bears and Mohawk Valley Falcons from 1962 to 1964.

Most of the ACFL's teams, including all of the teams that had been in the Continental League, folded following the 1971 season. The Hartford Knights and Bridgeport Jets survived, and both moved down to the Seaboard Football League in 1972. Hartford accrued a perfect season in that league in 1972, including several games with margins of victory over 40 points, and after much dissatisfaction with the league announced it was leaving with the intent to reform the ACFL. The ACFL returned for one final season in 1973 with Hartford, Bridgeport, and several teams promoted up from the SFL (which led to a trickle-up that brought Empire Football League teams upward to the SFL to fill the old SFL teams' void). The return, however, was short-lived; the league determined it would not compete with the World Football League and folded after the 1973 season.

Commissioner Cosmo Iacovazzi was inducted into the American Football Association's Semi Pro Football Hall of Fame in 1987.

Season standings

1962
W = Wins, L = Losses, T = Ties, PCT= Winning Percentage, PF= Points For, PA = Points Against

<div>

Championship games
 1962: Paterson Miners 17, Providence Steam Roller 14 (Double OT), played indoors in the Atlantic City Convention Hall
 1963: Newark Bears 23 Springfield Acorns 6
 1964: Boston Sweepers 14, Newark Bears 10
 1965: New Bedford Sweepers 13, Jersey Jets 9
 1966: Virginia Sailors 42, Lowell Giants 10
 1967: Virginia Sailors 20, Westchester Bulls 14
 1968: Hartford Knights 30, Virginia Sailors 17
 1969: Pottstown Firebirds 20, Hartford Knights 0
 1970: Pottstown Firebirds 31, Hartford Knights 0
 1971: Norfolk Neptunes 24, Hartford Knights 13
 1973: New England Colonials 41, Bridgeport Jets 17

Teams
 Ansonia Black Knights 1962-63
 Atlanta Spartans 1964
 Atlantic City Senators 1966
 Baltimore Broncos 1963
Boston Sweepers 1963-64
 Waterbury Orbits 1966-67/Bridgeport Jets 1968–71, 1973 (affiliated with New York Jets in 1969)
 Frankfort Falcons 1962
 Harrisburg Capitols/Harrisburg Colts 1963-69 (affiliated with Baltimore Colts in 1969)
 Hartford Charter Oaks 1963-64
 Hartford Knights 1968–71, 1973 (affiliated with Buffalo Bills in 1969)
 The Knights may have alternately been known as the Charter Oaks during its 1968 season.
 Holyoke Bombers 1965
Indianapolis Capitols 1970-71
 Jersey City Jets 1966
 Jersey Giants 1963-64
 Jersey Jays 1970-71
 Jersey Jets 1965
 Jersey Tigers 1970-71
 Long Island Bulls 1969-70 (affiliated with New York Giants in 1969)
 Long Island Chiefs 1973
 Lowell Giants 1966-68 (affiliated with Boston Patriots in 1969)
 Mohawk Valley Falcons 1963-65
 Mount Vernon Crusaders 1973
 Morrissey Club Steelers 1960-64 (affiliated with Boston Patriots)
Newark Bears 1963-64
New Bedford Sweepers 1965-66
 New England Colonials 1973 (affiliated with New England Patriots)
Norfolk Neptunes 1970-71
Orlando Panthers 1970-71
 Paterson Miners 1962 (prior to joining the ACFL, the Miners were based in Franklin, New Jersey)
 Pittsburgh Valley Ironmen 1963-65
 Portland Sea Hawks 1962-64
Pennsylvania Firebirds 1970-71
Pottstown Firebirds 1968-69 (affiliated with Philadelphia Eagles in 1969)
Providence Steam Roller 1962-64
 Quincy Giants 1969-71
 Rhode Island Steelers 1966
Richmond Rebels 1964
 Richmond Roadrunners 1968-70 (affiliated with New Orleans Saints in 1969–70)
 Scranton Miners 1965-66
 Scranton Pros 1964
 Springfield Acorns 1963-64
 Stamford Golden Bears 1962
 Virginia Sailors 1966-68 /  Roanoke Buckskins 1968-71 (affiliated with Washington Redskins from 1966 to 1969)
 Western Massachusetts Pioneers 1973
 Westchester Bulls 1967-68
 Westchester Crusaders 1963–64, 1973
 Wilmington Clippers/Renegades 1966-67

References

Further reading
 Gill, Bob Outsiders II: Minor League and Independent Football 1951-1985 (St. Johann Press, 2010) 

 
Defunct American football leagues in the United States
1962 establishments in the United States
1973 disestablishments in the United States
Sports leagues established in 1962
Sports leagues disestablished in 1973
Professional sports leagues in the United States